USS Spear (AM-322) was an  acquired by the United States Navy for the dangerous task of removing mines from minefields laid in the water to prevent ships from passing.

Spear was laid down as HMS Errant (BAM-22) on 28 October 1942 by Associated Shipbuilders, Seattle, Washington; renamed USS Spear and reclassified AM-322 on 23 January 1943; launched on 25 February 1943; sponsored by Miss Lois Wilcox; and commissioned on 31 December 1943.

World War II Pacific operations 
Following outfitting at Seattle, Washington, and shakedown off the California coast. Spear joined a convoy on 25 March 1944 and sailed from San Francisco as an escort. Five days later, she was ordered to proceed independently to Hawaii. The minesweeper conducted training exercises there until 3 May when she was assigned escort duty for convoys carrying troops and supplies to advance bases in the Marshall Islands at Majuro, Eniwetok, and Kwajalein.

Supporting the Guam assault 
On 17 July, the minesweeper was attached to a convoy of LST's and preceded to a rendezvous point just south of Guam for the impending amphibious assault on that island. The minesweeper was then assigned patrol duties in the transport screen off Orote Point. On 28 July, Spear had to maneuver to avoid enemy shellfire from the beach. During the remainder of the campaign, she escorted oilers on their nightly retirement from the assault area and conducted antisubmarine searches. She then returned to Pearl Harbor and resumed escort trips to advance bases.

Okinawa campaign 
Spear conducted antisubmarine patrols off Ulithi during the first three weeks of December 1944; escorted a convoy to Hollandia; and then resumed her ASW duties off Ulithi until mid-March 1945. On the 19th, she sortied with Task Group (TG) 52.14, Minesweeper Group 1 of the Amphibious Support Force, for the Okinawa assault. On the night of 26 March, Spear rescued several downed fliers. During the campaign, the minesweeper protected anchorages from enemy submarines and swept enemy mines. In 82 days of uninterrupted operations off Okinawa, Spear was under almost daily aerial attack, logging 202 attacks by enemy planes in April.
 
Spear steamed to Guam in June for tender availability and, six weeks later, was back at Okinawa when hostilities with Japan ended.

End-of-war operations 
Following the return of peace, she joined in mine-sweeping operations in the East China Sea; helped to clear the approach to and the mouth of the Yangtze River; swept mines off Chefoo, China; and participated in further sweeping operations off Jinsen, Korea, before returning to Shanghai and joining the Yangtze River Patrol Force. On 17 November, she got underway for Sasebo, Japan. Spear departed Japanese waters on 29 November 1945 en route to the United States, via Pearl Harbor.

Decommissioning 
Upon returning to San Diego, California, Spear was decommissioned and, in August 1946, was placed "in reserve, out of commission", with the Pacific Reserve Fleet. On 7 February 1955, the minesweeper's designation was changed to MSF-322. She was struck from the Navy List on 1 July 1972 and sold to the government of Mexico on 19 September.

Awards 
Spear received four battle stars for her World War II service.

Mexican Navy service
On 19 September 1972, the former Spear was sold to the Mexican Navy which renamed her ARM Ignacio de la Llave (C76). Her pennant number was later changed to G08, and changed again in 1993 to P107. Ignacio de la Llave had been retired from service by 2004.

Notes

References

External links
 
 Motor Gunboat/Patrol Gunboat Photo Archive
 uboat.net - minesweeper USS Spear of the Auk class
 Ships of the U.S. Navy, 1940-1945 Minecraft

 

Auk-class minesweepers of the United States Navy
Ships built in Seattle
1943 ships
World War II minesweepers of the United States
Valle-class patrol vessels